SM U-105 was one of the 329 submarines serving in the Imperial German Navy in World War I. 
U-105 was engaged in the naval warfare and took part in the First Battle of the Atlantic. After the war she was ceded to France, where the unit served as Jean Autric until being scrapped in 1938.

On 17 October 1917, SM U-105 met , an American troop transport, during the return leg of a voyage to Europe. Antilles was torpedoed by the submerged U-boat and went down just five minutes after being hit. A total of 67 persons were killed in the sinking, making the destruction of Antilles the event costing the single greatest number of American lives in the war to that date.

Design
German Type U 93 submarines were preceded by the shorter Type U 87 submarines. U-105 had a displacement of  when at the surface and  while submerged. The submarine was powered by two  engines for use while surfaced, and two  engines for use while submerged. The boat had two propeller shafts and two  propellers.

U-105 was fitted with six  torpedo tubes (four at the bow and two at the stern), twelve to sixteen torpedoes, one  SK L/45, and one  SK L/30 deck gun. She had a complement of thirty-six (thirty-two crew members and four officers).

Summary of raiding history

References

Notes

Citations

Bibliography

World War I submarines of Germany
German Type U 93 submarines
Ships built in Kiel
1917 ships
U-boats commissioned in 1917
Foreign submarines in French service